The 2016 China League One was the 13th season of the China League One, the second tier of the Chinese football league pyramid, since its establishment in 2004. The league's title sponsor is the e-commerce website 58.com.

Teams 
A total of 16 teams are contesting in the league, including 12 sides from the 2015 season, two relegated from the 2015 Chinese Super League and two promoted from the 2015 China League Two.

Team changes

To League One 

Teams relegated from 2015 Chinese Super League
 Shanghai Shenxin
 Guizhou Renhe

Teams promoted from 2015 China League Two
 Meizhou Kejia
 Dalian Transcendence

From League One 
Teams promoted to 2016 Chinese Super League
 Yanbian Changbaishan
 Hebei China Fortune
Teams relegated to 2016 China League Two
 Beijing BIT
 Jiangxi Liansheng

Name changes 
 Tianjin Songjiang F.C. changed their name to Tianjin Quanjian F.C. in December 2015.
 Dalian Aerbin F.C. changed their name to Dalian Yifang F.C. in December 2015.
 Qingdao Hainiu F.C. changed their name to Qingdao Huanghai F.C. in December 2015.
 Guizhou Zhicheng F.C. changed their name to Guizhou Hengfeng Zhicheng F.C. in January 2016.
 Meizhou Kejia F.C. changed their name to Meizhou Hakka F.C. in January 2016.
 Guizhou Renhe F.C. moved to the city of Beijing and changed their name to Beijing Renhe F.C. in January 2016.
 Harbin Yiteng moved to the city of Shaoxing and changed their name to Zhejiang Yiteng F.C. in January 2016.

Clubs

Stadiums and Locations

Managerial changes

Foreign players
The number of foreign players is limited to three per CL1 team.
Teams can use three foreign players on the field each game.

Players name in bold indicates the player is registered during the mid-season transfer window.

Foreign players who left their clubs or were sent to reverse team after the first half of the season.

Hong Kong/Macau/Taiwan outfield players (Contracts signed before 1 January 2016 do not count for the foreign player slot):

League table

Results

Positions by round

Goalscorers

Top scorers
{| class="wikitable"
|-
!Rank
!Player
!Club
!Total
|-
!rowspan=1|
| Luís Fabiano
|Tianjin Quanjian
|
|-
!rowspan=1|
|  Nyasha Mushekwi
| Dalian Yifang
|
|-
!rowspan=1|
| Biro-Biro
| Shanghai Shenxin
|
|-
!rowspan=1|
|  Japa
| Meizhou Hakka
|
|-
!rowspan=2|
|  Jaílton Paraíba
| Dalian Transcendence
|
|-
|  Nikica Jelavić
| Beijing Renhe
|
|-
!rowspan=4|
|   Mazola 
| Guizhou Zhicheng
|
|-
| Rodrigo
|Zhejiang Yiteng
|
|-
|  Aboubakar Oumarou
| Shenzhen F.C.
|
|-
|  Leke James
| Beijing Enterprises Group
|
|-
!rowspan=2|
| Ricardo Steer
|Zhejiang Yiteng
|
|-
|  Đorđe Rakić 
| Qingdao Huanghai
|
|-

Hat-tricks

Awards
The awards of 2016 China League One were announced on 9 November 2016.
 China League One Most valuable player:  Luís Fabiano (Tianjin Quanjian)
 China League One Top scorer:  Luís Fabiano (Tianjin Quanjian)
 China League One Best goalkeeper:  Zhang Lu (Tianjin Quanjian)
 China League One Young Player of the Year:  Ming Tian (Wuhan Zall)
 China League One Best coach:  Li Bing (Guizhou Hengfeng Zhicheng)

League Attendance

References

External links 
Official website 
China League One at sina.com 
China League One at sohu.com 
China League One at 163.com 

China League One seasons
2
China
China